Munderra is a rural locality in the Shire of Mareeba, Queensland, Australia.

Geography
The Tate River rises in the locality and flows to the west. California Creek, a tributary of the Tate, forms part of the northern boundary. Mount Cardwell is in the locality.

References 

Shire of Mareeba
Localities in Queensland